Maneswar Brahma is a Bodoland People's Front politician from Assam. He has been elected in Assam Legislative Assembly election in 2016 from Barama constituency.

References 

Living people
Bodoland People's Front politicians
Assam MLAs 2016–2021
People from Baksa district
Year of birth missing (living people)